Sir Horace Lamb  (27 November 1849 – 4 December 1934) was a British applied mathematician and author of several influential texts on classical physics, among them Hydrodynamics (1895) and Dynamical Theory of Sound (1910). Both of these books remain in print. The word vorticity was invented by Lamb in 1916.

Biography

Early life and education
Lamb was born in Stockport, Cheshire, the son of John Lamb and his wife Elizabeth, née Rangeley. John Lamb was a foreman in a cotton mill who had gained some distinction by the invention of an improvement to spinning machines, he died when his son was a child. Lamb's mother married again, and soon afterwards Horace went to live with his strict maternal aunt, Mrs. Holland. He studied at Stockport Grammar School, where he made the acquaintance of a wise and kindly headmaster in the Rev. Charles Hamilton, and a graduate of classics, Frederic Slaney Poole, who in his final year became a good friend. It was from these two tutors that Lamb acquired his interest in mathematics and, to a somewhat lesser extent, classical literature.

In 1867, he gained a classical scholarship at Queens' College, Cambridge. Since Lamb's inclination, however, was to pursue a career in engineering, he chose to decline the offer, and instead worked for a year at the Owens College in nearby Manchester, as a means of developing his mathematical proficiency further.

At that time, the Chair of Pure Mathematics at Owens College was held by Thomas Barker, an eminent Scottish mathematician, who graduated as Senior Wrangler and first Smith's prizeman from the Cambridge Mathematical Tripos in 1862. An acknowledged lecturer of high quality, Lamb prospered under the guidance of Barker, and was elected to a minor scholarship at Trinity College, Cambridge.

At Trinity, he was Second Wrangler in the Mathematical Tripos, 2nd Smith's prizeman and elected fellow in 1872. Among his professors were James Clerk Maxwell and George Gabriel Stokes. He was soon elected both a Fellow and a tutor in the college.

University of Cambridge, 1872–75
By 1874, Lamb had become thoroughly invested in his work at Trinity, preparing there an innovative and original series of lectures on the subject of hydrodynamics for third-year students. Richard Glazebrook, a final-year student at the time, wrote of them that they were 'a revelation', and praised Lamb for his lucid presentation of the properties of liquids in rotational motion. However, Lamb soon became romantically involved with Elizabeth Foot, sister-in-law to his former headmaster, and, since the conditions of his position at Trinity stipulated that he should hold it only so long as he was unmarried, he was compelled, in 1875, to resign and continue his work elsewhere.

University of Adelaide, 1876–1885
Lamb's acquaintance from Stockport, Frederic Slaney Poole, had by now for some years lived in South Australia; hearing of his engagement, Poole suggested in a letter that he should apply for the chair at the recently founded University of Adelaide.  In 1875, he was appointed the first (Sir Thomas) Elder Professor of Mathematics there, and took up the chair in March, 1876. Lamb was instrumental in the establishment of the academic and administrative structure of the university, and lectured in pure and applied mathematics, also giving practical demonstrations in physics. For the next ten years the average number of students enrolled in the Bachelor of Arts course at Adelaide was fewer than twelve; though Lamb also gave some public lectures in the evenings, his workload was relatively light. His deftly rendered and original A Treatise on the Mathematical Theory of the Motions of Fluids (which would later be reprinted as Hydrodynamics in 1895) was first published in 1878.

In 1883, Lamb published a paper in the Philosophical Transactions of the Royal Society applying Maxwell's equations to the problem of oscillatory current flow in spherical conductors, an early examination of what was later to be known as the skin effect. Lamb was elected a Fellow of the Royal Society in 1884.

University of Manchester, 1885–1920

Lamb was appointed to the Chair of Mathematics at Owens College, Manchester, in 1885 and which became the Beyer Chair in 1888, a position Lamb held until retirement in 1920 (Owens College was merged with the Victoria University of Manchester in 1904). His Hydrodynamics appeared in 1895 (6th ed. 1933), and other works included An Elementary Course of Infinitesimal Calculus (1897, 3rd ed. 1919), Propagation of Tremors over the Surface of an Elastic Solid (1904), The Dynamical Theory of Sound (1910, 2nd ed. 1925), Statics (1912, 3rd ed. 1928), Dynamics (1914), Higher Mechanics (1920) and The Evolution of Mathematical Physics (1924).

Later years, 1920–1934

In 1932 Lamb, in an address to the British Association for the Advancement of Science, wittily expressed on the difficulty of explaining and studying turbulence in fluids.
He reportedly said, "I am an old man now, and when I die and go to heaven there are two matters on which I hope for enlightenment. One is quantum electrodynamics, and the other is the turbulent motion of fluids. And about the former I am rather optimistic."

Lamb is also known for description of special waves in thin solid layers. These are now known as Lamb waves.

Lamb was survived by three sons and four daughters. The sons (who included Walter Lamb (classicist) and the painter Henry Lamb) were born at Adelaide, South Australia, and all became distinguished. He is buried at the Parish of the Ascension Burial Ground in Cambridge, with his wife.

Honours and awards
Lamb was elected a Fellow of the Royal Society in 1884, was twice vice-president, received its Royal Medal in 1902 and, its highest honour, the Copley Medal in 1924. He was president of the London Mathematical Society 1902–1904, president of the Manchester Literary and Philosophical Society, and president of the British Association in 1925. He was knighted in 1931. A room in the Alan Turing Building at the University of Manchester is named in his honour and in 2013 the Sir Horace Lamb Chair was created at Manchester. A building at the University of Adelaide also bears his name.

Publications

See also
Lamb (crater)
Lamb–Oseen vortex

References

External links
 
 
 

1849 births
1934 deaths
English physicists
19th-century English mathematicians
20th-century English mathematicians
Alumni of Trinity College, Cambridge
Fellows of Trinity College, Cambridge
Fellows of the Royal Society
Academics of the Victoria University of Manchester
Recipients of the Copley Medal
Royal Medal winners
Fluid dynamicists
Second Wranglers
People educated at Stockport Grammar School
People from Stockport
De Morgan Medallists
Manchester Literary and Philosophical Society